Fernando Adrián Pasquinelli (born 13 March 1980) is an Argentine former professional footballer who played as a striker.

Career
Born in Santa Fe, Pasquinelli spent his early career in Argentina with Boca Juniors and Talleres.

He had a brief spell in England with Leicester City, but failed to make a single appearance for the club.

He moved to Scotland in 2003, making 27 league appearances for Livingston. He contributed to their victorious 2003–04 Scottish League Cup campaign, including winning the penalty that Livingston scored to beat Dundee in the semi-final, and then coming on as a late substitute as they beat Hibernian in the 2004 Scottish League Cup Final.

After being released after one season, he signed for Aberdeen in August 2004. Pasquinelli made ten league appearances for Aberdeen, before being released in March 2005 due to injury.

After leaving Scotland in 2005, Pasquinelli later played in Argentina for Talleres and Sarmiento. While at Sarmiento, Pasquinelli scored 8 goals in 7 league games.

He had spells at Barracas Central and Club Atlético San Telmo before retiring from football in 2013.

References

External links
 Stats at BDFA

1980 births
Living people
Argentine people of Italian descent
Argentine footballers
Leicester City F.C. players
F.C. Motagua players
Livingston F.C. players
Aberdeen F.C. players
Scottish Premier League players
Argentine expatriate footballers
Expatriate footballers in England
Expatriate footballers in Scotland
Club Atlético Platense footballers
Talleres de Córdoba footballers
Boca Juniors footballers
Club Atlético Sarmiento footballers
Argentine expatriate sportspeople in England
Association football forwards
Argentine expatriate sportspeople in Scotland
Footballers from Santa Fe, Argentina
San Telmo footballers
CSyD Tristán Suárez footballers